Wolfgang Ockenfels, OP (born 25 January 1947 in Honnef, West Germany), is a Catholic priest, theologian and professor of social ethics.

Life 
In 1967, he joined the order of the Dominicans. Between 1968 and 1974, he studied at the philosophy at the College of the order in Walberberg, later he studied Catholic theology at the University of Bonn, as well as social ethics and economics in Fribourg (Switzerland). After his PhD in 1978, he became an editor of the Catholic conservative weekly newspaper Rheinischer Merkur for three years.

From 1985 to 2015, he was a professor for Christian Social Ethics at the University of Trier in West Germany. He was also an advisor to the papal council "Iustitia et Pax" in Rome.

Since 1992, he is editor-in-chief of the Christian journal Die Neue Ordnung. He frequently writes for the Catholic newspaper Die Tagespost. Ockenfels has edited many books on ethics, theology and politics. He received several awards, among them the Joseph-Höffner-Prize. Since 2018, he sits on the advisory council of the Desiderius-Erasmus-Stiftung, a foundation close to the Alternative for Germany party (AfD). He is a member of the Christian Democratic Union of Germany (CDU), but critical of chancellor Angela Merkel.

Books and publications

References 

 

1947 births
Living people
20th-century German Roman Catholic priests
People from Bad Honnef
20th-century German Catholic theologians
21st-century German Catholic theologians
German Dominicans
Dominican theologians
University of Bonn alumni
Academic staff of the University of Trier